Paduka Pattabhishekam is a 1945 Indian Telugu-language film directed and produced by Kadaru Nagabhushanam.

Plot
The story of the film is from the Hindu epic Ramayana. According to the father's wish Rama with Sita and Lakshmana goes to the forest. Bharata instead of becoming the crown king, as his mother's wish, goes to the forest and requests Rama to return to Ayodhya. Refusing to disobey the orders of their father, he gives away his Padukas to Bharata. Taking them back to Ayodhya, he crowns them and rules the kingdom for 14 years.

Remake
It was remade in 1966, starring Kantha Rao (actor).

Cast
 CSR Anjaneyulu  ... 	Lord Rama
 Pushpavalli	... 	Goddess Sita
 Banda Kanakalingeshwara Rao	... 	Bharata
 Addanki Srirama Murthy	... 	Dasharatha
Kannamba	... 	Kaikeyi
 Koccharlakota Satyanarayana	...  Lakshmana

References

External links
 Paduka Pattabhishekham film at IMDb.

1945 films
1940s Telugu-language films
Indian black-and-white films
Films based on the Ramayana
Hindu mythological films
Indian drama films
1945 drama films